The Toxocampinae are a subfamily of moths in the family Erebidae. Moths in the subfamily typically have a primitive form of genital claspers similar to those of some subfamilies of the Noctuidae.

Taxonomy
Morphological analysis previously classified the subfamily as the tribe Toxocampini of the former subfamily Catocalinae within Erebidae.  Phylogenetic analysis supports the subfamily as a clade within Erebidae but outside the Catocalinae (now called the Erebinae).

Genera
Anumeta
Apopestes
Autophila
Lygephila
Tathorhynchus

References

 
Moth subfamilies